Lake Minchumina (Menchuh Mene’  in Koyukon; Minchu Mina’ in Dinak'i) is a census-designated place (CDP) in Yukon-Koyukuk Census Area, Alaska, United States. As of the 2020 census, the population of the CDP is 30.

Geography
Lake Minchumina is located at  (63.893902, -152.302012).

"If we were to cut out a map of Alaska from a piece of paper and balance the map on the point of a pencil, we would have found the center point of the physical structure of the state. That point is at 63°50’ N, 152° W. or near Lake Minchumina."

"General Mitchell looked at Alaska on a globe. He saw that Alaska was approximately equal distance from all of the major urban-industrial centers of the world. Figure L.1 is a map of Alaska as seen from space. It is centered on Lake Minchumina in Interior Alaska. Note that we can see the major centers of Asia (Tokyo and Beijing are shown), Europe (Moscow, Berlin, Paris, and London are shown), and North America (New York, Toronto, and Los Angeles are shown). General Billy Mitchell viewed Alaska's relative location and found that it was, indeed, central to the urban-industrial world."

Footnote 

Figure L.1 - Alaska from Space. Orthographic projection
  

Climate
Minchumina has a continental subarctic climate (Köppen Dfc).

Demographics

Lake Minchumina first appeared as an unincorporated village on the 1950 U.S. Census. It appeared again in 1960, but did not report in 1970 or 1980. It returned again in 1990 as a census-designated place (CDP).

As of the census of 2000, there were 32 people, 16 households, and 9 families residing in the CDP. The population density was 0.1 people per square mile (0.1/km2). There were 41 housing units at an average density of 0.2/sq mi (0.1/km2). The racial makeup of the CDP was 84.38% White, 3.12% Native American, and 12.50% from two or more races. 6.25% of the population were Hispanic or Latino of any race.

There were 16 households, out of which 25.0% had children under the age of 18 living with them, 50.0% were married couples living together, 6.3% had a female householder with no husband present, and 43.8% were non-families. 37.5% of all households were made up of individuals, and 6.3% had someone living alone who was 65 years of age or older. The average household size was 2.00 and the average family size was 2.67.

In the CDP, the age distribution of the population shows 18.8% under the age of 18, 6.3% from 18 to 24, 40.6% from 25 to 44, 31.3% from 45 to 64, and 3.1% who were 65 years of age or older. The median age was 36 years. For every 100 females, there were 113.3 males. For every 100 females age 18 and over, there were 116.7 males.

The median income for a household in the CDP was $36,250, and the median income for a family was $33,750. Males had a median income of $26,250 versus $0 for females. The per capita income for the CDP was $26,781. None of the population and none of the families were below the poverty line.

Education
It was previously served by the Minchumina School of the Iditarod Area School District.

References

Census-designated places in Alaska
Census-designated places in Unorganized Borough, Alaska
Census-designated places in Yukon–Koyukuk Census Area, Alaska